Soldiers Cove (Scottish Gaelic: Camus an t-Saighdeir) is a small community in the Canadian province of Nova Scotia, located in Richmond County on Cape Breton Island .  It's named after veterans of the War of 1812 who settled in the area.

The community is located on Nova Scotia Trunk 4 between Barra Head and Hay Cove.

References
 

Communities in Richmond County, Nova Scotia
General Service Areas in Nova Scotia